So ist das Leben! Die Wagenfelds is a German television series.

See also
List of German television series

External links
 

1995 German television series debuts
1996 German television series endings
German television soap operas
Television shows set in Bavaria
German-language television shows
Sat.1 original programming